Indriyam is a 2000 Indian Malayalam-language horror film directed by George Kithu. The film is about a group of college friends who go into a haunted forest, with Vani Viswanath,  Vikram, Nishanth Sagar, Boban Alummoodan And Lena appearing amongst others in the cast. It was dubbed and released in Tamil as Manthira Kottai in December 2000, shortly after the success of Sethu, in which Vikram had featured.

Plot
A college group of anthropology students go to the remote forest of Muthuvan Mala, under the oversight of Prof. Shankaranarayanan, in order to study the tribal life which had existed there. A student, Sunny, unknowingly unleashes the spirit of Neeli, who is a ghost seeking revenge against the Thripangod royal family, one of whom had killed her and her lover. Consequently, Neeli starts killing off the students one by one and the police call for sorcerer Vadakkedath Namboothiri to be summoned.

Cast

Release
After release, a film critic noted that "It has a creditable screenplay which develops the vendetta plot convincingly". In December 2000, the film was dubbed and released in Tamil as Manthira Kottai to make most of Vikram's newfound fame following the success of Sethu (1999).

References

External links

2000s Malayalam-language films
2000 films
Indian horror films
2000 horror films